Akabli is a town and commune in Aoulef District, Adrar Province, in south-central Algeria. According to the 2008 census it has a population of 10,171, up from 7,513 in 1998, with an annual growth rate of 3.1%.

Geography

The town of Akabli is made up of three distinct parts,  lying at an elevation of  about a set of oases. Akabli is a part of the Tidikelt region of the central Sahara that extends from central eastern Adrar Province (where Akabli is located) to northeast Tamanrasset Province around In Salah. The oases in this region are sparser than in the Tuat and Gourara regions, in which most of the population of Adrar Province live, but there are still a number of towns such as Aoulef, Timokten, Tit and In Ghar.

Climate

Akabli has a hot desert climate (Köppen climate classification BWh), with extremely hot summers and mild winters, and very little precipitation throughout the year.

Transportation

Akabli is quite isolated, and the only road out of the town leads directly to the N52 highway  to the north. From the intersection, the N52 connects to Reggane and Adrar to the west and In Ghar and In Salah to the east.

Education

7.5% of the population has a tertiary education, and another 14.5% has completed secondary education. The overall literacy rate is 73.3% (second highest in the province), and is 83.2% among males (second highest in the province) and 63.4% among females.

Localities
As of 1984, the commune was composed of four localities:
Erg Chech
Sahel
Zaouïa El Mansour
Hanet

References

Neighbouring towns and cities

Communes of Adrar Province